Martin Iti (born 28 February 1983) is a New Zealand-Australian professional basketball player who last played for the Brisbane Spartans of the South East Australian Basketball League (SEABL). As a high school senior at Mount Zion Christian Academy, Iti was rated as the No. 8 high school recruit in the nation and the No. 1 high school center in the country. He played college basketball for the University of North Carolina at Charlotte and New Mexico State University.

Professional career
In September 2008, Iti signed with the Rotterdam Challengers of the Netherlands for the 2008–09 season. In 32 games for Rotterdam, he averaged 6.7 points, 4.7 rebounds and 1.0 blocks per game.

In February 2010, Iti signed with the Southland Sharks for the 2010 New Zealand NBL season. He went on to earn league Rookie of the Year honours. In December 2010, he re-signed with the Sharks for the 2011 season.

In August 2011, Iti signed with the Sydney Kings for the 2011–12 NBL season. In 16 games for the Kings, he averaged 0.6 points and 0.8 rebounds per game.

In December 2011, Iti signed with the Wellington Saints for the 2012 New Zealand NBL season.

In February 2013, Iti signed with the Ipswich Force for the 2013 Queensland Basketball League season. He returned to the Force for the 2014 season.

In March 2015, Iti signed with the Brisbane Spartans for the 2015 SEABL season. In 17 games for the Spartans, he averaged 4.2 points and 5.5 rebounds per game.

References

External links
Australiabasket.com profile
SEABL stats

1983 births
Living people
Australian men's basketball players
Australian expatriate basketball people in the United States
Australian expatriate basketball people in the Netherlands
Basketball players from Sydney
Centers (basketball)
Charlotte 49ers men's basketball players
Dutch Basketball League players
New Zealand men's basketball players
New Zealand expatriate basketball people in the United States
New Zealand expatriate sportspeople in the Netherlands
New Mexico State Aggies men's basketball players
Feyenoord Basketball players
Southland Sharks players
Wellington Saints players